Carpinus turczaninovii, the Turczaninow hornbeam or Korean hornbeam, is a species of flowering plant in the family Betulaceae, native to central China, the Korean Peninsula, and central and southern Japan. It is available from commercial suppliers, and can handle very hard pruning.

References

turczaninovii
Plants used in bonsai
Flora of North-Central China
Flora of South-Central China
Flora of Korea
Flora of Japan
Plants described in 1869